Out of the Body is a 1988 Australian supernatural thriller film directed by Brian Trenchard-Smith.

Plot summary
In Sydney, Australia, there's a killer on the loose, removing the eyes of his female victims. The only hope of catching him lies in an astral traveller named David Gaze, who is the prime suspect.

Cast
Mark Hembrow as David Gaze
Tessa Humphries as Neva St. Clair
Margaret Trenchard-Smith (as Margi Gerard) as Maggi Jarrott
Tim Campbell as Security Guard
Linda Newton as Carla Duprey
John Clayton as Sergeant Whittaker
Helen O'Connor as Barbara Sloan
John Ley as Senior Detective Delgarno

Production
The film was one of four pictures made around the same time by executive Tom Broadbridge. The others were Kadaicha, The 13th Floor and Vicious.

References

External links
Out of the Body at IMDb
Out of the Body at Oz Movies
Review at Mondo Exploito

Films directed by Brian Trenchard-Smith
Australian supernatural horror films
1980s English-language films
1980s Australian films